Twiss is a surname, and may refer to:

 Sir Frank Twiss (1910–1994), Royal Navy admiral
 Horace Twiss (1787–1849), English writer and politician
 Ian Twiss, Irish footballer
 Michael Twiss (born 1977), English footballer
 Peter Twiss (1921–2011), British test pilot
 Richard Twiss (1954–2013), Native American educator and author, co-founder and president of Wiconi International
 Richard Twiss (footballer) (1909–1970), English footballer
 Richard Twiss (writer) (1747–1821), English writer on travel and chess
 Richard Q. Twiss (1920–2005), British scientist
 Sumner Twiss, American academic
 Tilly Devine (née Twiss, 1900–1970), Australian criminal
 Sir Travers Twiss (1809–1897), English jurist
 William Twiss (1745–1827), British army general

See also
 Twisse
 Mount Twiss, Antarctica
 River Twiss in Yorkshire, England
 Twiss County, Western Australia
 Twiss parameters (accelerator physics)